Si, Senor is a 1919 American short comedy film featuring Harold Lloyd. It is believed to be lost.

Cast
 Harold Lloyd 
 Snub Pollard 
 Bebe Daniels  
 Sammy Brooks
 Billy Fay
 Estelle Harrison
 Lew Harvey
 Wallace Howe
 Dee Lampton
 Marie Mosquini
 Fred C. Newmeyer
 James Parrott
 William Petterson
 Hazel Powell
 Emmy Wallace (as Emmylou Wallace)
 Dorothea Wolbert
 Noah Young

See also
 Harold Lloyd filmography
 List of lost films

References

External links

1919 films
1919 comedy films
1919 short films
American silent short films
American black-and-white films
Films directed by Alfred J. Goulding
Lost American films
Silent American comedy films
American comedy short films
1919 lost films
Lost comedy films
1910s American films